The 2018 JC Ferrero Challenger Open was a professional tennis tournament played on clay courts. It was the first edition of the tournament which was part of the 2018 ATP Challenger Tour. It took place in Alicante, Spain between 2 and 7 April 2018.

Singles main-draw entrants

Seeds

 1 Rankings are as of 19 March 2018.

Other entrants
The following players received wildcards into the singles main draw:
  Pablo Andújar
  Carlos Boluda-Purkiss
  Alejandro Davidovich Fokina
  Bernabé Zapata Miralles

The following players received entry from the qualifying draw:
  Ivan Gakhov
  Daniel Gimeno Traver
  Gian Marco Moroni
  Mario Vilella Martínez

The following player received entry as a lucky loser:
  Federico Gaio

Champions

Singles

 Pablo Andújar def.  Alex de Minaur 7–6(7–5), 6–1.

Doubles

 Wesley Koolhof /  Artem Sitak def.  Guido Andreozzi /  Ariel Behar 6–3, 6–2.

References

2018 ATP Challenger Tour
2018 in Spanish tennis